Durham West was an electoral riding in Ontario, Canada. It was created in 1867 at the time of confederation. It contained the towns of Pickering and Ajax.

The riding first existed from 1867 until 1926, when it was distributed into the Durham riding. When Durham was split back into Durham East and Durham West, as well as Durham North in 1975, the riding existed until 1999 when it was redistributed into Pickering—Ajax—Uxbridge and Whitby—Ajax.

Members of Provincial Parliament

References

External links
 Legislative Assembly of Ontario: Past & Present MPPs

Former provincial electoral districts of Ontario